Kosmos 108 ( meaning Cosmos 108), also known as DS-U1-G No.1, was a Soviet satellite which was launched in 1966 as part of the Dnepropetrovsk Sputnik programme. It was a  spacecraft, which was built by the Yuzhnoye Design Office and was used to study the effects of solar activity on the upper atmosphere.

A Kosmos-2I 63S1 carrier rocket was used to launch Kosmos 108 into low Earth orbit. The launch took place from Site 86/1 at Kapustin Yar. The launch occurred at 18:00 GMT on 11 February 1966, and resulted in the successfully insertion of the satellite into low Earth orbit. Upon reaching orbit, the satellite was assigned its Kosmos designation, and received the International Designator 1966-011A. The North American Air Defense Command assigned it the catalogue number 02002.

Kosmos 108 was the first of two DS-U1-G satellites to be launched, the other being Kosmos 196 (19 December 1967). It completed operations on 26 February 1966. On 21 November 1966, it decayed from orbit and reentered the atmosphere.

See also

 1966 in spaceflight

References

Spacecraft launched in 1966
Kosmos satellites
1966 in the Soviet Union
Dnepropetrovsk Sputnik program